Henry Billington (12 November 1908 – 29 November 1980) was a British amateur tennis player, and the maternal grandfather of Tim Henman.
Billington competed at Wimbledon between 1948 and 1951, and also participated in the Davis Cup on three occasions.

His other career singles highlights include winning the Angmering-on-Sea Open two times (1937-38).

References

External links

1908 births
1980 deaths
English male tennis players
People from Newbury, Berkshire
British male tennis players
Tennis people from Wiltshire